Quetta International Airport (Urdu کوئٹہ بین الاقوامی ہوائی اڈہ)  (Balochi: کوئٹہ بالی پَٹ) ; is located at Quetta, the provincial capital of Balochistan, Pakistan. The airport is the fourth highest airport in Pakistan (1605 metres above sea level). It is second largest airport in the south region of the country and the largest for the province of Balochistan. Average scheduled flights were 1332, non-scheduled flights 247, and the total recorded passenger flow was 152,698 in 2007.

History
The airport is linked to local cities as well as central hubs domestically by several airlines. International services are at present carried out by the national flag carrier, Pakistan International Airlines (PIA), flydubai, and Air Arabia, although the city has also been served by regional carriers like Iran Aseman Airlines and Ariana Afghan Airlines in the past.

The airport like many airports in pre-independence days were mainly a small airstrip offering air operations on behalf of the British Empire. After independence, the national flag carrier of Pakistan launched Karachi-Quetta-Lahore flights in 1954. This led to the development of a new runway that was constructed by a French company in 1958. Fokker F-27 Friendship flights initiated in 1964. This meant a new apron had to be constructed to deal with this larger turboprop aircraft in 1968. Due to the growth of the airport and number of passengers travelling through it, PIA launched Boeing flights from the airport in 1972. The first international flight was launched in 1977. The revenue the airport generated allowed the construction of the terminal building in 1982. A new control tower was built between 1982 and 1983. Navigational aids Precision Approach Path Indicators and Doppler Very High Frequency Omnidirectional Range (DVOR) were installed in 1984. The main concourse hall was inaugurated in 2001 to accommodate a great influx of passengers and families that came to see off their relatives. Airblue and Shaheen Air International operated flights from Quetta, however due to more lucrative opportunities decided to withdraw.

Structure 
Quetta International Airport is the fourth highest airport as well as the largest airport in province of Balochistan. The airport is currently under evaluation to being upgraded to make it compatible with future needs of the geographical location. The CAA is currently working with provincial government to develop the airport to meet international standards. The terminal building consists of the concourse hall, briefing hall, Domestic and International arrival and two lounges on first floor for domestic and international departures. The aerodrome category for fire fighting is CAT 8. It has annual capacity of 250,000 passengers and growing. The airport has several facilities to handle the normal needs of passengers such as telephone calling (domestic/international) booths, money exchange facilities, automated teller machines, Internet stations (powered by Wateen), information counters, gifts and souvenir shops, snack shops, rent a car services, as well as a post office. At present, the following technical features are available at the airport. In 2007, the CAA of Pakistan allocated a Rs 270m budget for the upgrading work on the airport.

Lounges
Two lounges each for domestic and international operations
One CIP Premium Lounge for premium passengers or VIP diplomats
Apron
Aircraft parking capacity is available for two wide body aircraft such as an A300 and three narrow body or prop aircraft such as Fokker or Airbus A319 at one time.
Runway
 runway with the ability to handle a weight of one wide-body aircraft such as the A-300.
Additional
Shell Aviation Ltd carry out the re-fuelling of aircraft under an exclusive licence.
New taxiways have been fully constructed and the tarmac reinforced to handle larger aircraft.
Aircraft maintenance is very low at this airport, as it is not a hub for any air carrier.
Heated Storage, Livestock Handling, and Security for Valuables cargo can be handled at this airport.

Airlines and destinations

See also
 List of airlines of Pakistan
 List of airports in Pakistan
 Pakistan Civil Aviation Authority
 Transport in Pakistan
 Juzzak Airport

References

External links

 

Airports in Balochistan, Pakistan
International airports in Pakistan
Quetta